The chief minister of Sudurpashchim Province is the chief executive of the Nepal state of Sudurpashchim Province. In accordance with the Constitution of Nepal, the governor is a state's de jure head, but de facto executive authority rests with the chief minister. Following elections to the Povincial Assembly of Sudurpashchim Province, the state's governor usually invites the party (or coalition) with a majority of seats to form the government. The governor appoints the chief minister, whose council of ministers are collectively responsible to the assembly. Given the confidence of the assembly, the chief minister's term is for five years and is subject to no term limits.

Since the state's creation 2018, Sudurpashchim Province has had only one chief minister, who belongs to Communist Party of Nepal (Maoist Centre), its founder Trilochan Bhatta is an inaugural and current holder of the office who sworn in 15 February 2018 by winning the 2018 assembly election consecutively.

The current incumbent is Trilochan Bhatta of the CPN (Maoist Centre) since 2 February 2018.

See also 
Chief Minister of Province No. 1
Chief Minister of Madhesh Province
Chief Minister of Bagmati Province
Chief Minister of Gandaki Province
Chief Minister of Lumbini Province
Chief Minister of Karnali Province

Notes

Reference

External links 

Governors
 
Heads of government
Website of the Office of the Chief Minister